The women's 55 kg (121 lbs) Semi-Contact category at the W.A.K.O. World Championships 2007 in Coimbra was the second lightest of the female Light-Contact tournaments falling between featherweight and lightweight when compared to Full-Contact's weight classes. There were fourteen women from two continents (Europe and North America) taking part in the competition.  Each of the matches was three rounds of two minutes each and were fought under Semi-Contact rules.

Due to there being too few competitors for a tournament designed for sixteen, two of the women had a bye through to the quarter finals.  The tournament gold medallist was Russia's Maria Kushtanova who added to the gold medal she won in the Light-Contact category at Belgrade earlier in the year, by defeating Norway's Eirin Dale in the final on points.  Greece's Peny Galani and Ireland's Lorraine McDermott took bronze.

Results

Key

See also
List of WAKO Amateur World Championships
List of WAKO Amateur European Championships
List of female kickboxers

References

External links
 WAKO World Association of Kickboxing Organizations Official Site

Kickboxing events at the WAKO World Championships 2007 Coimbra
2007 in kickboxing
Kickboxing in Portugal